Kangaroo Tour is the name given to Australian national rugby league team tours of Great Britain and France, tours to New Zealand and the one-off tour to Papua New Guinea (1991). The first Kangaroo Tour was in 1908. Traditionally, Kangaroo Tours took place every four years and involved a three-Test Ashes series against Great Britain (sometimes called Northern Union or The Lions) and a number of tour matches. The 1911/12 and 1921/22 tours were by the Australasian Kangaroos as both teams included New Zealand players. Some Kangaroo tours to Great Britain and France also included international friendly matches against Wales, though these games were not given test match status.

The last full Kangaroo Tour was in 1994, although shortened Kangaroo Tours took place in 2001 and again in 2003.

Since 1954, the Kangaroos have also made a number of overseas tours for multi-team tournaments such as the World Cup, Tri-Nations and Four Nations, however these are not classed as Kangaroo tours.

Kangaroo tour of Great Britain and France

1908/09 Kangaroo Tour

Northern Union vs. Australia
Northern Union 22–22 Australia
Northern Union 15–5 Australia
Northern Union 6–5 Australia

Played: 45
Won: 17 Drew: 6 Lost: 22
Ashes: Great Britain 2–0

1911/12 Kangaroo Tour

Northern Union vs. Australasia

 First Test Northern Union 10–19 Australasia
 Second Test Northern Union 11–11 Australasia
 Third Test Northern Union 8–33 Australasia

Played: 35
Won: 28 Drew: 2 Lost: 5
Ashes: Australasia 2–0

1921/22 Kangaroo Tour

Great Britain vs. Australasia
 First Test Great Britain 6–5 Australasia
 Second Test Great Britain 2–16 Australasia
 Third Test Great Britain 6–0 Australasia

Played: 36
Won: 27 Drew: 0 Lost: 9
Ashes: Great Britain 2–1

1929/30 Kangaroo Tour

The Lions vs. Australia
 First Test The Lions 8–31 Australia
 Second Test The Lions 9–3 Australia
 Third Test The Lions 0–0 Australia
 Fourth Test The Lions 3–0 Australia

Played: 35
Won: 24 Drew: 2 Lost: 7
Ashes: Great Britain 2–1

1933/34 Kangaroo Tour

The Lions vs. Australia
 First Test The Lions 4–0 Australia
 Second Test The Lions 7–5 Australia
 Third Test The Lions 19–16 Australia

Played: 37
Won: 27 Drew: 0 Lost: 10
Ashes: Great Britain 3–0

1937/38 Kangaroo Tour

The Lions vs. Australia
 First Test The Lions 5–4 Australia
 Second Test The Lions 13–3 Australia
 Third Test The Lions 3–13 Australia

France vs. Australia
 First Test: France 6–35 Australia
 Second Test: France 11–16 Australia

Played: 35
Won: 22 Drew: 1 Lost: 12
Ashes: Great Britain 2–1

1948/49 Kangaroo Tour

Great Britain vs. Australia
 First Test Great Britain 23–21 Australia
 Second Test Great Britain 16–7 Australia
 Third Test Great Britain 23–9 Australia

France vs. Australia
 First Test: France 10–29 Australia
 Second Test: France 0–10 Australia

Played: 37
Won: 24 Drew: 0 Lost: 13
Ashes: Great Britain 3–0

1952/53 Kangaroo Tour

Great Britain vs. Australia
 First Test Great Britain 16–9 Australia
 Second Test Great Britain 21–5 Australia
 Third Test Great Britain 7–27 Australia

France vs. Australia
 First Test: France 12–16 Australia
 Second Test: France 5–0 Australia
 Third Test: France 13–5 Australia

Played: 40
Won: 33 Drew: 1 Lost: 6
Ashes: Great Britain 2–1

1956/57 Kangaroo Tour

A record eleven Queenslanders were selected for this tour.

Great Britain vs. Australia
 First Test Great Britain 21–10 Australia
 Second Test Great Britain 9–22 Australia
 Third Test Great Britain 19–0 Australia

France vs. Australia
 First Test: France 8–15 Australia
 Second Test: France 6–10 Australia
 Third Test: France 21–25 Australia

Played: 28
Won: 18 Drew: 1 Lost: 9
Ashes: Great Britain 2–1

1959/60 Kangaroo Tour

Great Britain vs. Australia
 First Test Great Britain 14–22 Australia
 Second Test Great Britain 11–10 Australia
 Third Test Great Britain 18–12 Australia

France vs. Australia
 First Test: France 19–20 Australia
 Second Test: France 2–17 Australia
 Third Test: France 8–16 Australia

Played: 24
Won: 15 Drew: 0 Lost: 9
Ashes: Great Britain 2–1

1963/64 Kangaroo Tour

Great Britain vs. Australia
 First Test Great Britain 2–28 Australia
 Second Test Great Britain 12–50 Australia
 Third Test Great Britain 16–5 Australia
The 1963 Kangaroos thus became the first Australian only side to win the Ashes on British soil.

France vs. Australia
 First Test: France 8–5 Australia
 Second Test: France 9–21 Australia
 Third Test: France 8–16 Australia

Played: 36
Won: 28 Drew: 1 Lost: 7
Ashes: Australia 2–1

1967/68 Kangaroo Tour

Great Britain vs. Australia
 First Test Great Britain 16–11 Australia
 Second Test Great Britain 11–17 Australia
 Third Test Great Britain 3–11 Australia

France vs. Australia
 First Test: France 7–7 Australia
 Second Test: France 10–3 Australia
 Third Test: France 16–13 Australia

Played: 27
Won: 16 Drew: 2 Lost: 9
Ashes: Australia 2–1

1973 Kangaroo Tour

Great Britain vs. Australia
 First Test Great Britain 21–12 Australia
 Second Test Great Britain 6–14 Australia
 Third Test Great Britain 5–15 Australia

France vs. Australia
 First Test: France 11–21 Australia
 Second Test: France 3–14 Australia

Played: 19
Won: 17 Drew: 0 Lost: 2
Ashes: Australia 2–1

1978 Kangaroo Tour

Great Britain vs. Australia
 First Test Great Britain 9–15 Australia
 Second Test Great Britain 18–14 Australia
 Third Test Great Britain 6–23 Australia

France vs. Australia
 First Test: France 13–10 Australia
 Second Test: France 11–10 Australia

Played: 22
Won: 16 Drew: 0 Lost: 6
Ashes: Australia 2–1

1982 Kangaroo Tour

Great Britain vs. Australia
 First Test Great Britain 4–40 Australia
 Second Test Great Britain 6–27 Australia
 Third Test Great Britain 8–32 Australia

France vs. Australia
 First Test: France 4–15 Australia
 Second Test: France 9–23 Australia

Played: 22
Won: 22 Drew: 0 Lost: 0
Ashes: Australia 3–0

The 1982 Kangaroos became the first team to go through Great Britain and France undefeated earning them the nickname The Invincibles.

1986 Kangaroo Tour

Great Britain vs. Australia
 First Test Great Britain 16–38 Australia
 Second Test Great Britain 4–34 Australia
 Third Test Great Britain 15–24 Australia

France vs. Australia
 First Test: France 2–44 Australia
 Second Test: France 0–52 Australia

Played: 20
Won: 20 Drew: 0 Lost: 0
Ashes: Australia 3–0

Emulating the 1982 Kangaroo tour, the 1986 Kangaroos went through Great Britain and France undefeated earning them the nickname The Unbeatables.

1990 Kangaroo Tour

Great Britain vs. Australia
 First Test Great Britain 19–12 Australia
 Second Test Great Britain 10–14 Australia
 Third Test Great Britain 0–14 Australia

France vs. Australia
 First Test: France 4–60 Australia
 Second Test: France 10–34 Australia

Played: 18
Won: 17 Drew: 0 Lost: 1
Ashes: Australia 2–1

1994 Kangaroo Tour

Great Britain vs. Australia
 First Test: Great Britain 8–4 Australia
 Second Test: Great Britain 8–38 Australia
 Third Test: Great Britain 4–23 Australia

France vs. Australia
 One-off Test: France 0–74 Australia

Played: 18
Won: 17 Drew: 0 Lost: 1
Ashes: Australia 2–1

2001 Kangaroo Tour

Great Britain vs. Australia
 First Test Great Britain 20–12 Australia
 Second Test Great Britain 12–40 Australia
 Third Test Great Britain 8–28 Australia

Played: 3
Won: 2 Drew: 0 Lost: 1
Ashes: Australia 2–1

2003 Kangaroo Tour

Great Britain vs. Australia
 First Test Great Britain 18–22 Australia
 Second Test Great Britain 20–23 Australia
 Third Test Great Britain 12–18 Australia

Played: 6
Won: 6 Drew: 0 Lost: 0
Ashes: Australia 3–0

Kangaroo tour of New Zealand

1919

New Zealand vs. Australia
 First Test New Zealand 21–44 Australia
 Second Test New Zealand 26–10 Australia
 Third Test New Zealand 23–34 Australia
 Fourth Test New Zealand 2–32 Australia

Played: 9
Won: 8 Drew: 0 Lost: 1
Trans-Tasman series: Australia 3–1

1935

New Zealand vs. Australia
 First Test New Zealand 22–14 Australia
 Second Test New Zealand 8–29 Australia
 Third Test New Zealand 8–31 Australia

Played: 6
Won: 5 Drew: 0 Lost: 1
Trans-Tasman series: Australia 2–1

1949

New Zealand vs. Australia
 First Test New Zealand 26–21 Australia
 Second Test New Zealand 10–13 Australia

Played: 10
Won: 9 Drew: 0 Lost: 1
Trans-Tasman series: Draw 1–1

1953

New Zealand vs. Australia
 First Test New Zealand 25–5 Australia
 Second Test New Zealand 12–11 Australia
 Third Test New Zealand 16–18 Australia

Played: 9
Won: 7 Drew: 0 Lost: 2
Trans-Tasman series: New Zealand 2–1

1961

New Zealand vs. Australia
 First Test New Zealand 12–10 Australia
 Second Test New Zealand 8–10 Australia

Played: 9
Won: 7 Drew: 0 Lost: 2
Trans-Tasman series: Draw 1–1

1965

New Zealand vs. Australia
 First Test New Zealand 8–13 Australia
 Second Test New Zealand 7–5 Australia

Played: 8
Won: 7 Drew: 0 Lost: 1
Trans-Tasman series: Draw 1–1

1969

New Zealand vs. Australia
 First Test New Zealand 10–20 Australia
 Second Test New Zealand 18–14 Australia

Played: 6
Won: 4 Drew: 0 Lost: 2
Trans-Tasman series: Draw 1–1

1971

New Zealand vs. Australia

 First Test New Zealand 24–3 Australia

Played: 3
Won: 1 Drew: 0 Lost: 2
Trans-Tasman series: New Zealand 1–0

1980

New Zealand vs. Australia
 First Test New Zealand 6–27 Australia
 Second Test New Zealand 6–15 Australia

Played: 7
Won: 5 Drew: 1 Lost: 1
Trans-Tasman series: Australia 2–0

1985

New Zealand vs. Australia
 First Test Australia 26–20 New Zealand (Brisbane)
 Second Test New Zealand 6–10 Australia
 Third Test New Zealand 18–0 Australia

Played: 6
Won: 5 Drew: 0 Lost: 1
Trans-Tasman series: Australia 2–1

1989

New Zealand vs. Australia
 First Test New Zealand 6–26 Australia
 Second Test New Zealand 0–8 Australia
 Third Test New Zealand 14–22 Australia

Played: 6
Won: 5 Drew: 0 Lost: 1
Trans-Tasman series: Australia 3–0

Kangaroo tour of Papua New Guinea

1991

Papua New Guinea vs. Australia
 First Test Papua New Guinea 2–58 Australia
 Second Test Papua New Guinea 6–40 Australia

Played: 5
Won: 5 Drew: 0 Lost: 0
Test series: Australia 2–0

See also
The Invincibles (rugby league)
 Rugby League Ashes
 Australia national rugby league team
 Great Britain national rugby league team

References

Further reading

External links
 Kangaroo Legs

 
Recurring sporting events established in 1908
1908 establishments in Australia